Michael Thomas Roarke (November 8, 1930 – July 27, 2019) was an American catcher and coach in Major League Baseball.

Roarke was born in West Warwick, Rhode Island, where he graduated from West Warwick High School in 1948. He earned a B.Sc. degree in history at Boston College, and served as captain of the Eagles' football and baseball teams. He won the Scanlan Award in 1951 for outstanding ability in scholarship, leadership, and athletic ability.

Minor-league apprenticeship
Like his college teammate, future MLB utilityman and manager Joe Morgan, Roarke signed with the local National League club, the Boston Braves, in 1952. After a brief stint with the Braves' Evansville farm club in the Class B Three-I League, Roarke entered the military, effectively delaying his professional debut until 1954.

Known as a good handler of pitchers and an excellent defensive catcher, Roarke struggled as a hitter, eclipsing a .250 batting average only three times in his seven-year minor league career. The Braves, who had moved to Milwaukee just before the 1953 season, employed one of the best and most durable catchers of the 1950s, eleven-time National League All-Star Del Crandall, and were also one of the era's deepest and strongest Major League clubs. They never called Roarke up from Triple-A.

Tigers' second-string catcher
After the 1959 season, Roarke was traded to the Detroit Tigers in a deal that included Charley Lau. He toiled one further season, 1960, in the minors (with the Denver Bears of the American Association) before finally making his Major League debut with the Tigers at age 30 on April 19, 1961. He spent four seasons (1961–64) as Detroit's second-string receiver, working behind Dick Brown, Gus Triandos and Bill Freehan. In 194 total games, Roarke batted .230 with six home runs and 44 runs batted in.

Bullpen and pitching coach
He retired as an active player on October 9, 1964, to become a bullpen coach with the Tigers (1965–66) and California Angels (1967–69). Roarke then transitioned from bullpen coach to pitching coach—one of the handful of former catchers who excelled at coaching a pitching staff. He returned to the Tigers in 1970 as the replacement for high-profile mound tutor Johnny Sain for one season.

Then, after a seven-year stint (1971–77) as a minor league manager and roving minor league pitching instructor, Roarke served as a pitching coach for the Chicago Cubs, St. Louis Cardinals (where he worked on two NL pennant winners— and —under Whitey Herzog), San Diego Padres and Boston Red Sox, retiring after the strike-shortened 1994 season. He also spent three seasons in his native Rhode Island as pitching coach of the 1981–83 Pawtucket Red Sox of the International League, working with his old college classmate, Morgan, during his first two years with Pawtucket.

He died on July 27, 2019, in West Warwick.

See also
 List of St. Louis Cardinals coaches

References

 Howe News Bureau, 1982 Boston Red Sox Organization Book

External links

 Mike Roarke at SABR (Baseball BioProject)

  
  
  
  
  
  
  

1930 births
2019 deaths
American football ends
American military personnel of the Korean War
Baseball coaches from Rhode Island
Baseball players from Rhode Island
Boston College Eagles baseball players
Boston College Eagles football players
Boston Red Sox coaches
California Angels coaches
Chicago Cubs coaches
Columbus Jets players
Denver Bears players
Detroit Tigers coaches
Detroit Tigers players
Evansville Braves players
Jacksonville Braves players
Louisville Colonels (minor league) players
Major League Baseball bullpen coaches
Major League Baseball catchers
Major League Baseball pitching coaches
Military personnel from Rhode Island
Minor league baseball managers
People from West Warwick, Rhode Island
Players of American football from Rhode Island
Rapiños de Occidente players
St. Louis Cardinals coaches
San Diego Padres coaches
Toledo Mud Hens managers
Toronto Maple Leafs (International League) players
Wichita Braves players
West Warwick High School alumni